The Salem Metropolitan Statistical Area (MSA), as defined by the United States Census Bureau, is a Metropolitan Statistical Area consisting of two counties in western Oregon, Marion and Polk. The principal city is Salem, the state capital, which has a population of 175,535. The Salem MSA had a population of 433,353 at the 2020 census. In 2010, there were 390,738 people living in the Salem MSA. In 2000, the MSA had a population of 347,214, and had a population of 278,024 according to the 1990 census.

Counties
Marion
Polk

Communities

Places with more than 125,000 inhabitants
Salem, 175,535 (principal city)

Places with 10,000 to 40,000 inhabitants
Dallas, 16,854
Four Corners, 16,740 (census-designated place)
Hayesville, 21,891 (census-designated place)
Keizer, 39,376
Woodburn, 26,013

Places with 1,000 to 10,000 inhabitants
Aumsville
Donald
Gervais
Hubbard
Independence
Jefferson
Mill City (partial)
Monmouth
Mount Angel
Silverton
Stayton
Sublimity
Turner
Willamina (partial)

Places with fewer than 1,000 inhabitants
Aurora
Brooks (census-designated place)
Butteville (census-designated place)
Detroit
Eola (census-designated place)
Falls City
Gates (partial)
Grand Ronde (census-designated place)
Idanha (partial)
Labish Village (census-designated place)
Marion (census-designated place)
Mehama (census-designated place)
Rickreall (census-designated place)
Scotts Mills
St. Paul

Unincorporated places
Breitenbush 
Monitor
Pedee
Perrydale
Pratum
Rosedale
Saint Louis
West Stayton
Zena

Demographics
As of the census of 2010, there were 390,738 people living in the area, a 12.5% increase over the 347,214 residents as of the 2000 census. The racial makeup of the MSA was 71% White, 0.8% African American, 1.2% Native American, 1.8% Asian, 0.6% Pacific Islander, .1% from other races, and 2.4% from two or more races. Hispanic or Latino of any race were 21.9% of the population.

As of 2000, the median income for a household in the MSA was $41,313, and the median income for a family was $48,343. Males had a median income of $35,254 versus $26,278 for females. The per capita income for the MSA was $18,845.

See also
Oregon census statistical areas

References

 
Marion County, Oregon
Polk County, Oregon
Metropolitan areas of Oregon